Spanish-style bullfighting is a type of bullfighting that is practiced in Spain, Mexico, Colombia, Ecuador, Venezuela, Peru, as well as in parts of southern France and Portugal. This style of bullfighting involves a physical contest with humans (and other animals) attempting to publicly subdue, immobilize, or kill a bull. The most common bull used is the Spanish Fighting Bull (Toro Bravo), a type of cattle native to the Iberian Peninsula. This style of bullfighting is seen to be both a sport and performance art. The red colour of the cape is a matter of tradition – bulls are color blind. They attack moving objects; the brightly-colored cape is used to mask blood stains.

Bullfighting season in Spain runs from March to October. The practice is also known as a corrida de toros ("bull-running") or tauromaquia. Since the late-1980s, bullfighting in Spain has declined in popularity due to animal welfare concerns, its association with blood sport, and its links to nationalism.

History

Pre-Roman
Most historians trace festivities involving bulls to prehistoric times, as a trend that once extended through the entire Mediterranean coast and has just survived in Iberia and part of France. Early bullfights had a high mortality rate. Alejandro Recio, a Spanish historian, considers the Neolithic city of Konya, Turkey, discovered by James Mellaart in 1958, as evidence of sacrificial tauromaquia associated with traditional rituals. This claim is based on the abundance of representations of bulls, as well as on the preservation of horns and bullheads attached to walls. Since then various archeological findings have proven the uninterrupted importance of the bull as a symbol of the sun for the Iberian cults, like the presence of berracos (known in Portuguese as berrão), or the importance of the bull in the surviving Celtiberian and Celtic rituals that continued into the 21st century. These pre-Roman religions centered on the ritual sacrifice of sacred animals through direct or symbolic combat and was a likely motive for the depiction of bulls.

Roman
Bullrings are believed to originate their bullfighting tradition from Roman gladiator games. During Roman Hispania gladiators were forced to fight animals by sword, such as bulls, bears, and wolves. The Romans tried to abolish and ban the "puere" practice of bullfighting, considering it was too risky for the youth and not a proper way to worship the state deities.

Spanish
According to "Frommer's Travel Guide," bullfighting in Spain traces its origins to 711 CE, with the first official bullfight, or "corrida de toros," being held in honor of the coronation of King Alfonso VIII. Once part of the Roman Empire, Spain owes its bullfighting tradition in part to gladiator games. At first, bullfighting was done on horseback and was reserved for Spanish aristocracy.

Arab prohibition
During the Arab rule of Iberia, the ruling class tried to ban the practice of bullfighting, considering it a pagan celebration and heresy. Bullfighting was illegal in all Arab territory but became a mark of identity and resistance for Christian Iberians, especially for the nobility that started using it as a way to gain prestige. At first, bullfighting was done on horseback and was reserved for Spanish aristocracy; in contests the "fighters" were referred to as rejoneadores.

Catholic excommunication

In the 16th century Pope Pius V banned bullfighting for its ties to paganism and for the danger it posed to the participants. Anyone who would sponsor, watch or participate in a bullfight was to be excommunicated by the Church. Spanish and Portuguese bullfighters kept the tradition alive covertly, and his successor, Pope Gregory XIII, took efforts to relax this penalty. Pope Gregory advised bullfighters to not use the sport as way to honor Jesus Christ or the Saints, as was typical in Spain and Portugal.

The Bourbons
King Philip V, the first King of Spain of Bourbon descent, ended bullfighting in the country because he believed it was in poor taste for nobles to practice such a bloody sport. The change in bullfighting standards ran parallel to the discontent of the foreign rule of the Bourbons, and their lack of interest in understanding the politics, economics or culture of their new kingdom culminated in the Esquilache Riots of 1766. New forms of bullfighting continued to develop despite anti-French and anti-nobility sentiments. After growing in popularity in Spain, King Carlos III attempted to ban bullfighting in 1771. He attempted to reduce the social tension by building two of the eldest and largest bullfighting rings in Madrid as part of an offensive to fix the hostility and alienation that the Spanish felt towards the French rulers. King Charles IV attempted to formally ban the sport again after his predecessor made concessions. King Joseph Bonaparte reversed this decision by hosting a bullfight during his coronation in 1808.

Joaquín Rodríguez Costillares 
Joaquín Rodríguez Costillares (1743–1800) was a Spanish bullfighter from Seville who has been credited with founding modern Spanish-style bullfighting. He established the "cuadrillas tradition" where teams of two or three banderilleros and two picadors taunt the bull. He also organized the tercios de lidia ("thirds of fight") borrowed from the theatre; invented the Veronica and other basic cape movements as well as the current traje de luces ("suit of light"); and created the cape maneuvers (muleta), typical in this style of bullfighting since the 19th century.

Participants 

Each matador has six assistants—two picadores ("lancers") mounted on horseback, three banderilleros ("flagmen"), and a mozo de espada ("the lad of the swords"). Collectively they compose a cuadrilla or team of bullfighters. The crew also includes an ayuda (aide to sword servant) and subalternos (subordinates) including at least two peones (pages, singular peón).

Parts of a bullfight 

The modern Spanish-style bullfight (corrida, "run") is highly standardized, with three distinct parts (tercios, "thirds"), the start of each of which is announced by a trumpet sound. The participants first enter the arena in a parade (paseíllo) to salute the presiding dignitary (presidente),  usually accompanied by band music. The corrida begins to the tune of live-played pasodobles, many of which were composed to honour famous toreros. Torero costumes are influenced by 17th century Andalusian clothing. Matadors are distinguished by a "suit of lights" (traje de luces), custom-made and embroidered with silver or golden thread.

The bull then enters the ring to be tested for aggressiveness by the matador and banderilleros with the magenta and gold capote (dress cape). Bulls are raised on the open range by specialist breeding estates called ganadería. The bull enters the arena with a rosette on its back bearing the colours of the estate of its origin.

Stage 1: Tercio de Varas 
The first stage is called the tercio de varas ("third of lances"). The matador observes how the bull reacts to the waving of the banderilleros' cloak. A bull trying to reach its querencia is often more dangerous than a bull that is attacking the cape directly. The initial attack by the matador is called the suerte de capote ("act of the cape"), and there are a number of fundamental "lances" (or passes) that matadors make; the most common being the verónica (named after Saint Veronica), which is the act of a matador letting their cloak trail over the bull's head as it runs past.

Then two picadores enter the arena each armed with a lance (vara), mounted on large heavily-padded and blindfolded horses. The entrance of the horse attracts the bull to the picadores. The picadores repeatedly drive their lances into the muscles (morrillo) of the bull's neck to weaken the animal. As the picadores stab the bull's neck, the bull charges and attempts to lift the picador's horse. If the picador is successful, the bull will hold its head and horns lower as a result of injury and weakness during the following stages of the fight. This makes the bull less dangerous to enable the matador to perform the passes of modern bullfighting. In a mandatory step in the corrida, regulations require that a plaza judge ensures a certain number of hits are made before it is considered completed.

Stage 2: Tercio de Banderillas 
In the next stage – the tercio de banderillas ("third of small flag") – the matador attempts to plant two barbed or dart-like sticks known as banderillas ("little flags") onto the bull's shoulders. These weaken the ridges of neck and shoulder muscle (which set fighting bulls apart from cattle) through loss of blood, while also spurring the bull into making more aggressive charges. By this point the bull has lost a significant amount of blood, exhausting the animal. The matador then enters with his cape and sword, attempting to tire the bull further with several runs at the cape.

The matadors place the banderillas around the bull. If the presidente decides that the bull is relatively weak or unwilling to fight, they may order the use of black banderillas, considered to be a poor reflection on the breeder.

Stage 3: Tercio de Muerte 

In the third and final stage – the tercio de muerte ("third of death") – the matador re-enters the ring alone with a small red cape or muleta in one hand and a sword (estoc) in the other. This cape is stretched with a wooden dowel and, in right-handed passes, the sword as well. Having dedicated the bull to an individual or the whole audience, the matador uses his cape to attract the bull in a series of passes, demonstrating their control over it. The red colour of the cape is a matter of tradition – bulls are color blind. The movement of the cape is what irritates bulls; the colour by itself has the purpose of masking blood stains.             

The faena is the entire performance combined with the muleta, which is usually broken down into a series of tandas (episodes). A typical tanda  consists of three to five basic passes and then the finishing touch (remate), such as a pase de pecho, or pase de desprecio. Well-received passes are celebrated by the audience with shouts of "¡ole!". The faena ends with a final series of passes in which the matador with a  attempts to manoeuvre the bull into a position to stab it between the shoulder blades and through the aorta or heart.

The act of thrusting the sword (estoca or estoque) is called an estocada. A clumsy estocada that fails to give a "quick and clean death" will often raise loud protests from the crowd and may ruin the whole performance. Although the matador's final blow is usually fatal, it may take the bull some time to die. The matador must kill the bull in 15 minutes after the first  pass, at most. If a further three minutes elapse, a second  will be given; a third and final  is given after a further two minutes. The presidente will then give an order to have the bull returned to its pen, or, if local law so requires, to have the bull killed outside the ring. It is a dishonor for the failing matador.

The bull's body is dragged out by a team of mules. Very rarely, a bull will be allowed to survive a fight as an indulgence granted in recognition of an exceptional performance. If he stands still, he will resume their action and kill the bull. Such bulls are generally retired from competition and raised as studs, as their experience in the ring makes them extremely dangerous opponents. A fighting bull is never used in the ring twice, because they learn from experience, and the entire strategy of the matador is based on the assumption that the bull has not learned from previous experience. This also invalidates bulls who have been run in their estate by illegal fighters, who in earlier times would sneak into an estate by night to practice their skills.

A  (trophy) is the usual indicator of a successful . When the records of bullfights are kept,  earned by the matador are always mentioned. If the crowd demands, the matador is allowed to take a lap of victory around the ring. To award the matador with another ear or with two ears and the tail, depends solely on the 's appreciation. A matador who won at least two ears is given the permission to be carried on the shoulders of the admirers. In general, a matador that faces a bull that is freed is usually awarded , although only symbolically; ears or the tail can only be physically cut off of a dead bull.

Hazards 
Bullfighting is normally fatal for the bull, and it is dangerous for the matador. Picadors and banderilleros are sometimes gored, but this is not common. The suertes with the capote are risky, but it is the faena, in particular the estocada, that is the most dangerous. A matador of classical (Manolete) style is trained to divert the bull with the muleta but to come close to the right horn as he makes the fatal sword-thrust between the scapulae and through the aorta. At this moment, the danger to the matador is the greatest.

Most matadors have been gored many times. A special type of surgeon has developed, in Spain and elsewhere, to treat cornadas, or horn-wounds. The bullring normally has an infirmary with an operating room, reserved for the immediate treatment of matadors with cornadas. The bullring has a chapel where a matador can pray before the corrida and where a priest can be found in case an emergency sacrament of extreme unction (also known as Anointing of the Sick or Last Rites) is needed.

Popularity 

A poll conducted in 2014–2015 by the Spanish Ministry of Culture places bullfighting 10th in the list of most popular paid leisure activities. In 2015 9.5% of Spaniards went to a paid bullfight. By Autonomous Communities, Navarre headed the list, followed by Castile-Leon, Aragon, La Rioja, Castile-La Mancha and Extremadura. The regions least interested in bullfighting were Galicia, the Canary Islands, Catalonia and the Balearic Islands. According to the poll, during the 2014–15 period 9.5% of the potential audience (Spaniards aged 15 and higher) would have attended a corrida at least once; this amounts to over 3.5 million people.

Women in bullfighting 

The history of female bullfighters participating in Spanish-style bullfighting has been traced to the sport's earliest renditions, namely during the late-1700s and early 1800s. Francisco Goya, an 18th-century Spanish painter, first depicted a female bullfighter in his work La Pajuelera, which featured a woman sparring with a bull on horseback. The Spanish government banned women from participating in the sport from 1909 to 1934, following the Second Spanish Republic's liberation of women until 1939. On 10 August 1974, under the dictatorship of Francisco Franco, women were once again allowed to bullfight. María de los Ángeles Hernández Gómez was the first woman to earn her bullfighting license (torera) after the ban was lifted. During the Spanish Civil War of the 1930s, women were forced to exile in other Spanish-speaking countries and the United States in order to continue bullfighting. Throughout the 1980s women had difficulty completing their alternativa, a ceremony where a bullfighter becomes a matador, due to the social pressures of the decade.

Anti-bullfighting movement 

Activism against bullfighting has existed in Spain since the beginning of the early 20th century, when a group of intellectuals, belonging to the Generation of '98, rallied against the popularity of bullfighting and other social issues, dismissing them as "non-European" elements of Spanish culture, which were to blame for the country's social and economic backwardness. 

In the 21st century, bullfighting has come under increasing attack from animal rights activists and political actors for its links to Spanish nationalism. Separatist and nationalist sentiment in Catalonia has played a key role in the region-wide ban of a practice which is strongly associated to Spanish national identity.
However the  runnings of the bulls are not banned.
Galician and Basque nationalists have also expressed abolitionist stances, although in the case of the latter this has been somewhat mooted by the conundrum of bullfighting being at the heart of the San Fermin festival in Pamplona. Animal welfare concerns are perhaps the prime driver of opposition to bullfighting outside Spain, although rejection of traditionalism and Criollo elitism may also play a role in Latin America.
In the Canary Islands, bullfights are banned but cock fights, banned in the rest of Spain, are popular.

Animal rights activists claim bullfighting is a cruel or barbarous blood sport, in which the bull suffers severe stress and a slow, torturous death. A number of animal rights or animal welfare activist groups such as Antitauromaquia ("Antibullfighting") and StopOurShame undertake anti-bullfighting actions in Spain and other countries.

Other arguments in favor of bullfighting include those to the effect that the death of animals in slaughterhouses is often much worse than the death in the ring, and that both types of animal die for entertainment since humans do not need to consume meat, eating it instead for taste (bulls enter the food chain after the bullfight). The last common defense to the practice is the conservationist standpoint for both the tradition itself and the Bravo bull variety, as Bravo bulls are the closest living relative to the European wild bull, completely extinct now and divided into sub-breeds whose only use is provision of meat and milk, serving the food industry.

After years of increased pressure against bullfighting by abolitionist movements within Spain, the death of bullfighter Victor Barrio in July 2016 led to hundreds of comments being posted on various social media expressing joy towards the event and openly mocking his family and widow. This led to a significant backlash within Spain against anti-bullfighting activism, and criminal investigations are ongoing against those involved. Within a few days of Barrio's death, over 200,000 signatures had been collecting demanding action be taken against one such activist.

Special events

Professional 
The rejoneo or corrida de rejones: A rejoneador (lancer) on horseback tries to stab the bull with javelins called rejones de castigo in the first stage and banderillas in the second. In the final stage, the rejoneador kills the bull with a rejón de muerte (lance of death). On some occasions, the rejoneador will kill the bull on foot in the traditional way with muleta and estoca.
 The recortes: A bullfighter dodges around the bull and does not use a cape or sword. Bulls are not killed during this type of bullfight. Most specialists in this form of bullfighting come from Aragon.
 Comedy spectacles, such as El bombero torero y los enanitos toreros ("The bullfighting fireman and the bullfighting dwarves").

Amateur 
 The encierro: A "running" of the bulls through the streets.  Customarily, runners run before the bulls to guide them from the pen to the plaza, where the bulls will await the afternoon's bullfight. The most famous is that of Pamplona in July, although encierros exist in towns throughout Spain.  It is a dangerous activity, and care should be taken by those who wish to participate. In Segorbe, bulls are herded to the bullring by riders on horseback, an event called Entrada de toros y caballos, which is a tourist attraction.
 The bous al carrer (bulls at the street in Catalan) commonly found in Comunidad Valenciana and some places in Catalonia. The main difference from a encierro is that the bulls aren't directed to any bullring
 A Mediterranean variation, called bous a la mar (bulls at the sea), takes place on a dock. The youths jump into the water when the cow has cornered them. One place famous for this festivity is Dénia
 Another variation is the toro embolado ("fire bull"). This fiesta takes place at midnight. Balls of flammable material or actual fireworks are placed on the horns. The bull is set free on the street where young men dodge and run away from the charging animal
 The Toro de la Vega: This takes place in September at Tordesillas. A bull is run through an open area and over a bridge across the Duero River. There a crowd (on foot and on horse) tries to kill the bull with spears and lances before it reaches the other side.  Considered as an espectáculo tradicional (traditional spectacle) by the government of Castilla y León.
 The vaquillas (sokamuturra in Basque): A young cow of fighting stock is freed in a small ring (often built for the period of the festival and then dismantled) among local youths who tease her. The cow may have a dangling rope for recovery purposes.

Gallery

The phases of the Spanish-style bullfighting

See also 

 Olé
 Portuguese-style bullfighting
 Lamborghini: auto-manufacturer known for naming their cars after Spanish bulls

References 

Animal rights
Cruelty to animals
 
Bullfighting